Neuro-sama is a chatbot styled after a female VTuber that hosts livestreams on the Twitch channel "vedal987". Her speech and personality are generated by an artificial intelligence (AI) system which utilizes a large language model, allowing her to communicate with viewers in a live chat. She was created by a computer programmer and AI hobbyist named Jack Vedal, who decided to build upon the concept of an AI Vtuber by combining interactions between AI gameplay and a computer-generated avatar. She debuted on Twitch on December 19, 2022 after four years of development.

Neuro's content primarily centers around playing video games, notably Osu! (2007), in which her gameplay once defeated the best human player in the world, and Minecraft (2011), in which her adaptations to sandbox gameplay have gained notoriety. According to Vedal, these in-game actions are driven by a separate AI model but exist within the same AI system. Other aspects of her content delivery include singing songs, notably "Blinding Lights" and "Your Reality", and reacting to YouTube videos.

While playing games or participating in other activities, she frequently engages with her viewers by responding to their questions and acknowledging donations. Her comedic and sometimes controversial responses to the live chat have gone viral, accelerating her rise in popularity. On January 11, 2023, the Twitch channel received a temporary ban for unspecified "hateful conduct", likely stemming from controversial statements made by the AI, including skepticism surrounding the validity of the Holocaust during a stream. Vedal implemented measures to prevent Neuro-sama from making offensive statements after this occurred.

The channel was unbanned on January 25, 2023 and quickly surpassed 100,000 followers. Upon returning to Twitch, Neuro-sama's content expanded to include live reactions to content creators and streamers, as well as collaborations with other Vtubers.

See also 
 15.ai, an artificial intelligence speech synthesizer that generates voices from an assortment of fictional characters from a variety of media sources
 Tay, another artificial intelligence influencer that got banned for denying the Holocaust

References 

AI software
Chatbots
Fictional characters introduced in 2022
Twitch (service) streamers
Virtual influencers
VTubers